is a Japanese boxer. He competed in the men's featherweight event at the 1960 Summer Olympics. At the 1960 Summer Olympics, he defeated Gaby Mancini of Canada, before losing to Jerzy Adamski of Poland.

References

External links
 

1939 births
Living people
Japanese male boxers
Olympic boxers of Japan
Boxers at the 1960 Summer Olympics
Sportspeople from Akita Prefecture
Featherweight boxers
20th-century Japanese people